Teazle, teasle, teazel or teasel may refer to:

 Plants of the genus Dipsacus, including:
 Fuller's teazle, Dipsacus fullonum
 Sir Peter Teazle (1784 – 1811), a racehorse